Hana Zelinová (20 July 1914 in Vrútky – 16 March 2004 in Bratislava) was a Slovak prose writer and dramatist. She wrote several novels influenced by the Slovak social novel and the Scandinavian saga. Zrkadlový most, her first collection of short stories, was published in 1941. Zelinová penned three Ibsenesque plays in the 1940s that dealt with the role of women in urban society.


Works
 Zrkadlový most (The Bridge of Mirrors) (1941)
 Angel's Earth (1946)
 Diablov čardáš (The Devil's Csardas) (1958)
 Elizabeth's Court (1971)
 The Call of Wind (1974)
 The Flower of Fright (1977)

References

Further reading
Buck, Claire (ed.) (1992). The Bloomsbury Guide to Women's Literature. NY: Prentice Hall.

External links 
 

Slovak novelists
1914 births
2004 deaths
20th-century Slovak women writers
20th-century Slovak writers
Slovak women novelists
Women short story writers
People from Vrútky